"Playing With Fire" a song by Swedish singer, Darin, released as the second single from his sixth studio album Exit. The song was written by Darin, Jim Beanz and J Nick, while being produced by the latter two. 

The single was released on 18 January 2013 as digital download. Darin posted a little preview of the song on his YouTube channel three days before its release and a longer video preview was posted by Swedish tabloid Aftonbladet. In the video, showing the recording of the song in the studio, Darin said that it was the first song he had written together with Jim Beanz during his trip to the USA and that he eventually chose it to be the second single for the album.

Charts

Certifications

Release history

References

2012 songs
2013 singles
Darin (singer) songs
Songs written by Jim Beanz
Songs written by Darin (singer)
Universal Music Group singles